The UConn Huskies baseball program is a college baseball team that represents the University of Connecticut in the American Athletic Conference.  The Huskies compete in the National Collegiate Athletic Association (NCAA) Division I.  The current head coach is Jim Penders, who will coach his seventeenth season in 2020.

The team has had nineteen head coaches since its first season of baseball in 1896. There was no team in 1918 due to World War I. Since its creation in 1947, the Huskies have made five appearances in the College World Series, two under J. Orlean Christian and three under Larry Panciera.  

Panciera holds the highest winning percentage in Connecticut baseball history, with a .648 mark over his eighteen seasons.  James Nicholas and Charles A. Reed both failed to win a game and share the mark for lowest winning percentage.  Christian coached the longest, staying for 26 seasons, while nine coaches served only one season. Baylock delivered both Husky Big East Conference baseball tournament championships in 1990 and 1994, along with the only divisional championship (1985) of the seven seasons the Big East played in a two division format. Penders won the only conference regular season championship in 2011.

Key

Coaches

Notes

References

 
Lists of college baseball head coaches in the United States
UConn Huskies baseball